National Route 275 is a national highway of Japan connecting Chūō-ku, Sapporo and Hamatonbetsu, Hokkaidō in Japan, with a total length of 315.2 km (195.86 mi).

References

National highways in Japan
Roads in Hokkaido